Anton Nikolayevich Lazutkin (born 5 November 1994) is a Russian football player.

Club career
He played his first game for the main squad of FC Rostov on 24 September 2015 in a Russian Cup game against FC Tosno.

References

External links
 

1994 births
Sportspeople from Rostov-on-Don
Living people
Russian footballers
Association football defenders
FC Rostov players